Jake Wood is the sole owner of Ms. Olympia, Rising Phoenix World Championships, Muscle & Fitness Hers and Mr. Olympia.

References

External links 
 Jake Wood on Instagram

American bodybuilders
Year of birth missing (living people)
Living people